Calobryales (formerly Haplomitriales) is an order of plants known as liverworts.

This order contains one family, Haplomitriaceae, with a single extant genus Haplomitrium.

Taxonomy 
 Order Haplomitriales Buch ex Schljakov 1972 [Calobryales Campbell ex Hamlin 1972] 
 Family Haplomitriaceae Dědeček 1884
 Genus †Gessella Poulsen 1974
 Genus Haplomitrium Nees 1833 nom. cons.

References

External links 
  Information on family Haplomitriaceae

 
Liverwort families